The 2017 Little Swan World Cup was a professional non-ranking team snooker tournament that took place from 3 to 9 July 2017 at the Wuxi City Sports Park Stadium in Wuxi, China. It was the 15th edition of the event, and was televised live by Eurosport Player and repeated on Eurosport 1.

The China A pair of Ding Junhui and Liang Wenbo won the event, beating the English pair of Judd Trump and Barry Hawkins 4–3 in the final, winning the last three frames. Ding Junhui made a break of 59 in the deciding frame against Judd Trump.

Teams and players

Prize fund
Winner: $200,000
Runner-Up: $100,000
Semi-final: $60,000
Quarter-final: $40,000
Third in group: $22,500
Fourth in group: $15,000
Fifth in group: $10,000
Sixth in group: $7,500
Total: $800,000

Format
The 2017 World Cup used the same format as that used in 2015. There were 24 national teams, with two players competing for each side, and the initial round divided the entrants into four groups of six. During the Group Stage, every national team played a best-of-five frame match against each of the other sides in their pool. All matches consisted of five frames, two singles, a doubles frame, and two reverse singles. The top two teams from each group advanced to the Knockout Stages, the order being determined by total frames won. If there is a tie in either of the first two places the following rules determine the positions. If two teams are equal, the winner of the match between the two teams will be ranked higher. If three or more teams are tied, a sudden-death blue ball shoot-out will be played. Teams tied for positions 3 to 6 would remain tied and share the prize money for those positions.

During the quarter-finals, semi-finals, and championship final, the eight qualifying team were paired off in a head-to-head knockout. The format for these matches was a best-of-seven frame competition with the contest coming to an end as soon as one team had won four frames. These encounters were scheduled as two singles, a doubles frame, two reverse singles, another doubles frame, and a winner-take-all singles if necessary.

Group stage

Group A

China B finished above Brazil because they won the match between the two teams.

Group B

Belgium finished above China A because they won the match between the two teams.

Group C

Group D

Knock-out stage

Final

Century breaks
There were 14 century breaks made in the tournament.
  – 140 Ryan Day, 109 Mark Williams
  – 133, 116 Thepchaiya Un-Nooh, 101 Noppon Saengkham
  – 133, 104 Mark Allen
  – 130 John Higgins
  – 121 Luca Brecel
  – 112 Judd Trump
  B – 112 Zhou Yuelong
  – 105 Neil Robertson
  – 105 Duncan Bezzina
  – 103 Marco Fu

References

External links
 

World Cup (snooker)
World Cup
World Cup
Snooker competitions in China
Sport in Wuxi
July 2017 sports events in Asia